Penyffordd railway station serves the village of Penyffordd in Flintshire, Wales. The station is 7¼ miles (12 km) north of Wrexham Central on the Borderlands Line.

History
The station was opened in 1877 by the Wrexham, Mold and Connah's Quay Railway, on their 1866 line from Wrexham to Buckley. The route closed to passengers in 1962, but the connection to it from the station was used for freight traffic towards Mold until 1983 to serve the Synthite factory in Mold. The curve of the branch from the Borderlands line west was used as sidings which still remain, however are disused. The east to west line from Chester to Mold was lifted in 1985. The station's 24-lever signal box, which opened in 1885, controlled these and a second siding link into the nearby Castle Cement factory - this latter connection is still occasionally used by trainloads of imported coal to supply the factory kilns. The current signal box was opened on 17 December 1972.

On the eastern side of the station was an adjoining goods yard which closed on 4 May 1964, and reopened on 4 October 1971 for distributing coal. The station became an unstaffed halt in 1969.

The station was renamed from Penyffordd for Leeswood to Penyffordd on 6 May 1974.

Facilities
The station has no ticket facilities, so these must be bought in advance of travel or on the train. The original buildings have been replaced with standard waiting shelters. Train running information is offered via CIS screens, telephone (on platform 2) and timetable poster boards. There is step-free access to both platforms, but the station is not listed as DDA-compliant due to the barrow crossing linking the platforms and latched gate at the main entrance.

Services
The station is served by an hourly service southbound to Wrexham General and northbound to Bidston for connections to Liverpool via the Wirral Lines. This drops to a two-hourly frequency in the evenings. From December 2017 A normal weekday frequency now runs on most Bank holidays.

On Sundays there is a train roughly every 90 minutes in each direction.

References

Bibliography

External links

Railway stations in Flintshire
DfT Category F2 stations
Former Great Central Railway stations
Railway stations in Great Britain opened in 1877
Railway stations served by Transport for Wales Rail
1877 establishments in Wales